Pithoragarh (Kumaoni: Pithor'garh) is a Himalayan town with a Municipal Board in Pithoragarh district in the Indian state of Uttarakhand. It is the largest town in Kumaon hills. It is an education hub of the hilly region as the town has Laxman Singh Mahar Govt.P.G.College, Seemant Institute of Technology, now known as Nanhi Pari Seemant Engineering Institute and a nursing college.

Etymology 
"The district is named after its headquarters town, Pithoragarh. Tradition has it that during the reign of the Chand Rajas of Kumaon, one Piru, also called Prithvi Gosain, built a fort here and named it Prithvigarh which, in the course of time, got changed to Pithoragarh."

History 
Pithoragarh city and its surrounding areas were part of the Manaskhand region, which extended from the Kailash Mountain in the north to Bhabar & Terai in the south, as mentioned in the Skanda Purana. The Asuras and Nagas appear to be the earliest inhabitants of the region, who were later superseded by the Kiratas, Khasas and the Kunindas. The Kuninda Kings of the region may have become the feudatories of The Kushana Kings, who held their sway over the region in the last quarter of the 1st century AD. The region subsequently came under the Kurmanchal kingdom, which had its capital first at Jyotirmath and then at Karikeyapura (Modern day Baijnath) in the Katyur Valley.

Upon the disintegration of the Katyuris and fall of kingdom in 13th century, Pithoragarh came under the rule of Bam kings of Saur. The Bam kings were feudal to the Raikas of Doti and was a branch of katyuri kings, and had their capital at Udaipur near Pithoragarh, However, the Rajas used to come down to Rameshwar and Bailorkol during the winter months. The Bam kings, who ruled over Saur were:

 Karakil Bam 
 Kakil Bam 
 Chanari Bam 
 Arki Bam 
 Jnani Bam 
 Shakti Bam
 Vijai Bam 
 Hari Bam

In the fifteenth century, King Bharti Chand of Champawat amassed a huge army, and started plundering and killing in the regions ruled by the Doti Kings. This resulted in a war, which lasted for 12 years, and ended with a victory for the Chands. After the death of Bharti Chand in 1462, Nagmalla, the king of Doti attacked his son, Ratna Chand who was successful in defending himself. Nagmalla was killed in the war and the Bams became feudatories of the Chands. The pargana of Saur came under direct control of the Kingdom of Kumaon in the sixteenth century during the rule of King Balo Kalyan Chand, when it was given to him by the Raika king of Doti as dowry for marrying his Daughter.

In 1790, the Chand kings built a new fort on the hill where the present Girls Inter College is situated. This fort was destroyed by the Indian government in 1962 after China attacked India.[why?] The Chand rule, at its zenith, is seen as one of the most prominent empires in Kumaon. Their rule also coincides with a period of cultural resurgence. Archeological surveys point towards the development of culture and art forms in this period.

A Branch of Indian National Congress was established in the region in 1912, and in 1916, many people from Pithoragarh attended the Lucknow session of Congress. The Non-cooperation movement was started in the region in 1921 and in 1930, 10 people from Pithoragarh participated in the Civil disobedience movement. Subsequently, the Congress won the Pithoragarh seat in the Provincial Elections in 1937. The Quit India Movement of 1942 found greater support in Pithoragarh and about 150 persons were arrested while several were fined. The Congress won the Pithoragarh seat again in the General Elections of 1945 for the Provincial Assembly, and in 1947, along with the rest of India, this region also won independence from the British Rule.

Geography 

It lies in the revenue Division of Kumaon and is located 188 km northeast of Nainital, the administrative headquarters of Kumaon. It has an average elevation of 1,627 metres (5,338 feet). It is situated in the centre of the western half of the Saur Valley. The valley is spread across around 50 square kilometers. According to the Bureau of Indian Standards, on a scale ranging from I to V in order of increasing susceptibility to earthquakes, the city lies inside seismic zone V. It lies in the Moderate damage risk (B) area in Wind & Cyclone Zone and is declared a No Flood Zone.

Climate
Pithoragarh has a monsoon-influenced climate. The summer season from April to mid-June is moderately warm with occasional thunderstorms, whilst the monsoon season from mid-June to mid-September is humid with heavy showers almost daily. This gives way to a warm and sunny autumn season. The winter season brings pleasant afternoons, very cold mornings, and spells of frontal rain accompanied by sparse snowfall.

Government and politics 
Pithoragarh is an urban town with a Nagar Palika Parishad or Municipal Council spread over an area of 9 square km. It is divided into 20 wards for the sake of administration. It is also part of the Almora Lok Sabha Constituency, thus has BJP MP Ajay Tamta representing the city and part of the Pithoragarh Vidhan Sabha constituency, represented by INC's Mayukh Mahar.

Pithoragarh town, before the creation of a Municipal Board, was administered as a Town Area by a committee consisting of 10 members and a chairman. The Municipality of Pithoragarh came into existence on 24 Nov 1962 and the members and the chairman of Town Area Committee became its members. The board was, however, dissolved on 12 Mar 1963, and the town was then administered by the District Magistrate, who was the ex-officio chairman of the board under the U.P. Municipalities Act of 1916. There was no elected body and the affairs were supervised by an Officer-in-charge (a deputy collector) to whom the powers were delegated by the District Magistrate.

Culture

Festivals  
Pithoragarh Mahotsav has played a significant role in conserving and sharing Pithorgarh's unique culture. It showcases local culture through music and dance, often featuring performances in the Kumaoni language.

Kandali Festival A flower called Kandali (Strobilanthes wallichii) blooms once every twelve years in the Chaudans region of Pithoragarh district, and the people celebrate the Kandali festival between August and October. Local people, known as Shaukars or Rangs, take part in the week-long festival with joy and enthusiasm in various villages throughout the region. The festival begins with the worship of a Shiva linga made of a flour mixture of barley and buckwheat. During this festival, local liquor is traditionally consumed. It is performed in a decorated corner of the courtyard by each household. People pray for good fortune. The individual Poojas are followed by a community feast. Then, the women and men, in traditional dresses and laden with gold and silver ornaments, assemble around a tree on the sacred ground of the village. Strips of white cloth are tied to the tree and a flag is raised.

Hilljatra is a pastoralists' and agriculturalists' festival, which is celebrated in some parts of Pithoragarh districts. The aathon (eight day of bhado) and Gawra Visarjan became part of Hilljatra during the development process. The festival, which originated in West Nepal's Sorar (Mahakali) region, was first introduced to the valley in Kumor village, Pithoragarh. The people of Bajethi, another village near Pithoragarh, accepted the Jatra, and it was modified and introduced as Hiran chital in the Kanalichhina and Askot regions. Hilljatra is linked to ropai (paddy planting) and other rainy-season agricultural and pastoral labours (Hill = mud, Jatra = Jaat). It has also been linked to the Champawat ruler's victory.

In popular culture 

The small town was extensively described in a novel by American author Bradley Swift, From Pithoragarh to Pittsburg. Major parts of the Bollywood film Sandeep Aur Pinky Faraar have been shot in the city.

Transport 

Pithoragarh is not connected by any direct train services, however it is well connected by road, and it also has an airport. The National Highway 9 passes through Pithoragarh. Landslides and cloudbursts, caused by heavy rains that fall during the summer monsoon, often interrupt transportation networks.

The airport, which was constructed in 1991 for administrative use, was previously mainly used by the Indian Air Force for defence purposes. The airport was upgraded in 2016 at an estimated cost of Rs 64.91 crore.

Bareilly Airport is located around 249 km from Pithoragarh is a major airport nearby which is connected to cities like Mumbai, New Delhi and Bengaluru.

Pithoragarh is connected to the rest of Uttarakhand by all-weather motorable roads. The total road length in Pithoragarh is 80 km. Haldwani and Tanakpur are two entry points for entering Pithoragarh by road. Both are connected by railway services, the nearest railway stations being Tanakpur (151 km) and Kathgodam (212 km). Regular state bus transport services along with private taxi services are available at both places. Buses, which are the most commonly used mode of transport, are run by government agencies and private operators. Agencies operating long-distance bus services include Uttarakhand Transport Corporation, K.M.O.U, and various private operators.

Education

Schools in Pithoragarh are run by the state government or private organisations, Hindi and English  are the primary languages of instruction. Schools in Pithoragarh follow the "10+2+3" plan.

After completing their secondary education, students typically enroll in Inter Colleges that have a higher secondary facility and are affiliated with the  Central Board of Secondary Education, CISCE or the Department of Education of the Government of Uttarakhand. They usually choose a focus on liberal arts, business, or science.

As of 2011, Pithoragarh had 17 primary schools, 20 middle schools, 22 secondary schools, 14 senior secondary schools, and 1 degree college. Before independence, during the middle of the 19th century when Pithoragarh was part of Almora, there were only two middle schools in Pithoragarh.

LSM Govt. Post Graduate College is the only government college in the town providing studies up to post-graduation. It was previously affiliated to Kumaun University, Nainital. With the growing impact of I.T., the government opened SIT Pithoragarh in 2011. Almost a dozen of privately owned computer centres opened up later in the town. A few of the IT centres which are in Pithoragarh town are NIIT, Hiltron, Aptech, UpHill Computers, Info. Park, Sri Calculation and Care Computer.

Construction of a medical college is proposed by the state government and it has been allotted a budget of ₹450 crores ($64 million).

Temples
Haat Kalika Temple
Kotgari Temple
Patal Bhuvaneshwar

Notable people 
 Khadg Singh Valdiya
 Vinod Kapri
 Hemant Pandey

Pushkar Singh Dhami
Unmukt Chand
 Mary Reed

References

External links 

 Pithoragarh website
 Pithoragarh at wikimapia.

 
Tourism in Uttarakhand